Esmaeelabad, Nosratabad is a village in Corrin Rural District, in the Nosratabad of Zahedan County, Sistan and Baluchestan Province, Iran. At the 2006 census, its population was 29, in 7 families.

References 

Populated places in Zahedan County